Charles A. Jerabek (July 23, 1922 – June 28, 2006) was an American politician who served in the New York State Assembly from the 3rd district from 1969 to 1972.

References

1922 births
2006 deaths
Republican Party members of the New York State Assembly
20th-century American politicians